The 15th Ryder Cup Matches were held October 11–13, 1963 at the Atlanta Athletic Club, at the site now known as East Lake Golf Club in Atlanta, Georgia. The United States team won the competition by a score of 23 to 9 points. The U.S. did not lose a single match in the afternoon sessions.

Format
The Ryder Cup is a match play event, with each match worth one point.  The competition format changed in 1963, with the addition of four-ball (better ball) matches on a third day of play.  The schedule of play was as follows:
Day 1 (Friday) — 8 foursomes (alternate shot) matches, 4 each in morning and afternoon sessions
Day 2 (Saturday) — 8 four-ball (better ball) matches, 4 each in morning and afternoon sessions
Day 3 (Sunday) — 16 singles matches, 8 each in morning and afternoon sessions
With a total of 32 points, 16 points were required to win the Cup.  All matches were played to a maximum of 18 holes.

Teams
Source: 

In his second Ryder Cup, Arnold Palmer was the last playing captain in the competition. He was 3–1 in pairs and 1–1 in singles.

Despite having won his third major title as a professional at the PGA Championship in July, 23-year-old Jack Nicklaus was not a member of the U.S. team. Eligibility rules set by the PGA prevented him from participating in the Ryder Cup until 1969. He competed as a player through 1981, missing only the 1979 edition, and was the non-playing captain of the U.S. team in 1983 and 1987. 

The British team was determined using a points system, points being earned in 9 stroke-play events during the 1963 season. Winners of the 1963 Open Championship and News of the World Match Play received automatic places. The first qualifying event was the Schweppes PGA Close Championship in early April with the Senior Service Tournament in September being the final one. Dave Thomas won the News of the World Match Play but, since he finished 9th in the points list, the team was filled with the leading 10 players in the points list: Coles, Bernard Hunt, Huggett, Alliss, Haliburton, O'Connor, Weetman, Will, Thomas and Geoff Hunt.

Friday's matches

Morning foursomes

Afternoon foursomes

Saturday's matches

Morning four-ball

Afternoon four-ball

Sunday's matches

Morning singles

Afternoon singles

Individual player records
Each entry refers to the win–loss–half record of the player.

Source:

United States

Great Britain

References

External links
PGA of America: 1963 Ryder Cup
About.com: 1963 Ryder Cup

Ryder Cup
Golf in Georgia (U.S. state)
Ryder Cup
Ryder Cup
Ryder Cup
Ryder Cup